Yi Suhyeong (1435–1528), also spelled as Lee Soo-Hyung, was a Korean politician and Confucian scholar, writer, and poet of the Joseon dynasty. His pen names were Dochon and Gongbukheon. After King Sejo of Joseon usurped the throne and the loss of his nephew, he left politics and secluded himself away from society.

Life 
He studied at Kim Dam's school and later married one of Kim's daughters. In 1450, he succeeded to an ancestral government position at 17 years old. He was succeeded by Sung Yorang (선교랑), Junsaeng Seoryung (전생서령) and Bu Sajik (부사직).

In 1455, Sejo of Joseon usurped the throne of his nephew, Danjong of Joseon. Angered, Yi Suhyeong left government service and retired to a hermitage in the mountains.

In 1457, after Danjong's assassination, he mourned for 3 years for his nephew. Missing his nephew, as he had since Danjong's death, he cut himself off completely from all human contact, for the next 70 years.

Works 
 Dochonsunsaengsilgi (도촌선생실기, 桃村先生實紀)
 Gwaedangangwangrok (괴단감광록, 槐壇曠感錄)

See also
 Sejo of Joseon
 Danjong of Joseon
 Kim Dam

site web 
 Yi Suhyeong:Korean historical persons information 
 Gongbukheon
 [이정웅의 노거수와 사람들] 단종 향한 일편단심…세인 관심 끌어 
 宣城 金氏 撫松軒 金淡 (선성 김씨 무송헌 김담) 
 400살 ‘시조木’ 두 그루 여전히 성성, 경북 봉화 띠띠미 마을 
 Dochonsunsaengsilgi

Notes

References 
 Yi Ga-won, Yijomyunginyuljeon(이조명인열전), Eulyumunhwasa, 1965

1435 births
1528 deaths
Korean Confucianists
15th-century Korean philosophers
15th-century Korean poets
Korean male poets